Hemicordulia flava is a species of dragonfly in the family Corduliidae, 
known as the desert emerald. It inhabits still pools in Central Australia.

Hemicordulia flava is a small to medium-sized, black and yellow dragonfly with long legs. In both males and females the inboard edge of the hindwing is rounded.

Gallery

See also
 List of dragonflies of Australia

References

Corduliidae
Odonata of Australia
Insects of Australia
Endemic fauna of Australia
Taxa named by Günther Theischinger
Taxa named by J.A.L. (Tony) Watson
Insects described in 1991